Calamodontophis ronaldoi is a species of snake in the family Colubridae. The species is endemic to southern Brazil.

Etymology
The specific name, ronaldoi, is in honor of Brazilian herpetologist Ronaldo Fernandes (born 1966).

Geographic range
C. ronaldoi is found in the Brazilian state of Paraná.

Description
C. ronaldi may be identified by distinctive markings on the head and body. On the head, it has a black comma-shaped blotch which extends from the corner of the mouth to the gular scales, and a separate oval black blotch on the parietals. On the body, it has a light-colored longitudinal dorsal line.

Reproduction
C. ronaldi is viviparous.

References

Further reading

Calamodontophis
Reptiles described in 2006
Reptiles of Brazil
Endemic fauna of Brazil
Taxonomy articles created by Polbot